Ostrožno is a local community of the City Municipality of Celje in central-eastern Slovenia. Until 1982, Ostrožno was an independent settlement.

References

Local communities of the City Municipality of Celje